Mitchellville is a city located in Polk and Jasper counties in the U.S. state of Iowa. The population was 2,485 at the time of the 2020 census.

Mitchellville is part of the Des Moines–West Des Moines Metropolitan Statistical Area.

The Iowa Correctional Institution for Women is located in Mitchellville.

History
Mitchellville was founded by Thomas Mitchell (1816-1894) in 1856 and it incorporated as a city on September 30, 1875. Mitchell's farm was later purchased by Polk County, becoming Thomas Mitchell Park. Mitchell was the first white settler in Polk County, Iowa.

Geography
Mitchellville is located at  (41.667115, -93.360152).

Demographics

2010 census
As of the census of 2010, there were 2,254 people, 651 households, and 430 families living in the city. The racial makeup of the city was 91.7% White, 5.8% African American, 0.8% Native American, 0.5% Asian, 0.2% from other races, and 1.0% from two or more races. Hispanic or Latino of any race were 2.4% of the population.

There were 651 households, of which 35.3% had children under the age of 18 living with them, 53.0% were married couples living together, 9.4% had a female householder with no husband present, 3.7% had a male householder with no wife present, and 33.9% were non-families. 27.5% of all households were made up of individuals, and 9.1% had someone living alone who was 65 years of age or older. The average household size was 2.53 and the average family size was 3.12.

The median age in the city was 37.2 years. 20.4% of residents were under the age of 18; 8.8% were between the ages of 18 and 24; 35.2% were from 25 to 44; 25.3% were from 45 to 64; and 10.2% were 65 years of age or older. The gender makeup of the city was 36.5% male and 63.5% female.

The 2010 census includes the prisoners of the Iowa Correctional Institution for Women, whereas the 2000 census did not.  This accounts for the drastic change in male/female ratio between 2000 and 2010.

2000 census
As of the census of 2000, there were 1,715 people, 650 households, and 455 families living in the city. The racial makeup of the city was 97.49% White, 0.29% African American, 0.12% Native American, 0.70% Asian, 0.41% from other races, and 0.99% from two or more races. Hispanic or Latino of any race were 1.34% of the population.

There were 650 households, out of which 39.4% had children under the age of 18 living with them, 55.7% were married couples living together, 10.8% had a female householder with no husband present, and 30.0% were non-families. 25.5% of all households were made up of individuals, and 10.8% had someone living alone who was 65 years of age or older. The average household size was 2.55 and the average family size was 3.09.

28.9% are under the age of 18, 7.9% from 18 to 24, 29.5% from 25 to 44, 20.0% from 45 to 64, and 13.6% who were 65 years of age or older. The median age was 35 years. For every 100 females, there were 95.6 males. For every 100 females age 18 and over, there were 87.0 males.

The median income for a household in the city was $45,250, and the median income for a family was $52,113. Males had a median income of $34,327 versus $26,202 for females. The per capita income for the city was $18,572. About 4.3% of families and 4.6% of the population were below the poverty line, including 4.9% of those under age 18 and 7.5% of those age 65 or over.

Government  

The Iowa Department of Corrections Iowa Correctional Institution for Women is in Mitchellville.

The United States Postal Service operates the Mitchellville Post Office.

Education

Southeast Polk High school operates the school district.

Notable people
 Clair Cameron Patterson (1922–1995), geochemist who determined the age of the Earth and discovered significant lead contamination from industry
 J. J. Stiffler (1934–2019), electrical engineer and computer scientist

See also

 Universalist Church, listed on the National Register of Historic Places
 KICJ, radio station

References

External links

 City of Mitchellville

 

Cities in Iowa
Cities in Polk County, Iowa
Cities in Jasper County, Iowa
Des Moines metropolitan area
Populated places established in 1856
1856 establishments in Iowa